Disney's One Too (later known as Disney's Animation Weekdays) was an American two-hour Sunday-to-Friday children's programming block that aired on UPN (and sometimes in syndication) from September 6, 1999 to August 31, 2003. A spin-off of the Disney's One Saturday Morning block on ABC (which is owned by The Walt Disney Company), it featured animated series from Disney Television Animation aimed at children between the ages of 6 and 11.

History

Beginning deal with UPN 
In January 1998, UPN began discussions with The Walt Disney Company (owner of rival network ABC) to have the company program a daily two-hour children's block for the network, airing on weekdays (during the morning or afternoon hours) and Sunday mornings. Attempts to reach a time-lease agreement deal with Disney were called off one week after negotiations started due to a dispute between Disney and UPN over how the block would be branded and the amount of E/I programming that Disney would provide for the block; UPN then entered into discussions with then-corporate sister Nickelodeon (both networks were owned by Viacom) to produce a new block. That February, UPN entered into an agreement with Saban Entertainment (then a subsidiary of Fox Family Worldwide, which Disney later acquired in 2001 and later acquire all of 21st Century Fox's assets in 2019) – which distributed two series recently aired on the UPN Kids block around that time, Sweet Valley High and Breaker High – to program the Sunday-to-Friday block.

In March 1998, UPN resumed discussions with Disney and the following month, The Walt Disney Company and UPN came to an agreement to provide Disney-produced programs on the network on weekdays (from 7:00am – 9:00am or 3:00pm – 5:00pm) and Sunday (from 9:00am – 11:00am). The block was originally announced under the working title "Whomptastic", though the name was changed before the launch of the block for greater brand identity (incidentally, "whomp" was used as a pejorative term in the Disney-produced animated series Recess, one of the series that would end up part of the new block, as a substitute for "sucks").

The new lineup was later renamed Disney's One Too in July 1999, formatted to serve as a competitor block to ABC's existing children's block Disney's One Saturday Morning. The block premiered on September 6, 1999, replacing UPN Kids, which ended its run the day before (on September 5) after four years. Compared to the format of One Saturday Morning, One Too varied in that, instead of incorporating hosted segments, short segment gags from the series featured in the block (such as Sabrina: The Animated Series, Doug and Recess, all of which – alongside a few other series – were originally aired on One Saturday Morning) were actually shown, often preceding the start of each program, and after commercial breaks. The block also featured an alternate opening sequence, using more futuristic buildings and a theme similar to that used on One Saturday Morning. Many series previously aired on One Too continued in reruns on two Disney-branded cable television networks, Toon Disney and Disney Channel.

Closure of block and syndication 
In September 2002, the One Too branding was discontinued (due to Disney's One Saturday Morning replacing with ABC Kids); although the UPN block wasn't rebranded (with bumpers and promos simply being created for each individual show). However, the Disney.com website referred to it under the title Disney's Animation Weekdays as a result of the rebranding of the ABC block from One Saturday Morning to ABC Kids. The block aired for the last time on August 31, 2003, with the time periods being turned over to UPN's affiliates; this left UPN as the only "big six" broadcast television network with no children's programming (and would never broadcast one again for the rest of the network's existence until its 2006 shutdown, and one of only two major commercial broadcast networks that did not air a children's programming block (the other being Pax TV, which discontinued its Pax Kids lineup in 2000, before returning children's programming as I: Independent Television through the 2006 launch of Qubo, as a 24/7 network, it was pulled off the air in 2021).

Aftermath 
UPN was not the first "big six" network to pull children's programming: NBC became the first to remove children's series entirely in August 1992, when the network launched a live-action block for teenagers called TNBC; children's programming returned to NBC in 2002, through a time-lease agreement with Discovery Kids. In the years since the block was discontinued, all other major broadcast networks, including UPN successor The CW, would gradually abandon children's programming by selling their respective children's blocks to Litton Entertainment, who produces primarily unscripted E/I content targeted nominally at teenagers (but having an older demographic overall by ratings), or in the case of Fox, removing children's programming entirely. Fox's sister network, MyNetworkTV, has never supplied children's programming as part of its lineup; both networks leave the responsibility of acquiring E/I programming to the affiliates, primarily through the syndicated block Xploration Station in the case of the former.

Programming
Notes

 1 Indicates that the program also ran ABC prior to the block.
 2 Indicates that the program aired episode premieres.

Originally from Disney 
 Recess (1999-2003)1 2
 Buzz Lightyear of Star Command (2000–03)1 2
 Doug (1999–2000)1
 Hercules: The Animated Series (1999–2000)1
 The Legend of Tarzan (2001–03)2
 Pepper Ann (2000–01)1 2
 The Weekenders (2001–02)1 2

Acquired programming 
 Digimon (2002–03, contained reruns of Digimon Tamers, as well as new episodes of Digimon Frontier)
 Sabrina: The Animated Series (1999–2002)1 2

See also
 The Disney Afternoon – a syndicated children's program block that ran from 1990 to 1997.
 Disney's One Saturday Morning – a Saturday morning children's block that ran on ABC from 1997 to 2002 before rebranding as ABC Kids.

References

 
Children's television networks in the United States
Joint ventures
UPN
UPN original programming
Television programming blocks
Television syndication packages